White Coke ("colorless Coca-Cola") was a clear variant of Coca-Cola produced in the 1940s at the request of Marshal of the Soviet Union Georgy Zhukov. Like other clear colas, it had the same flavor as the original, virtually unchanged by the absence of caramel coloring.

History

Zhukov was introduced to Coca-Cola during, or shortly after, World War II by his counterpart in Western Europe, Dwight D. Eisenhower, who was also a fan of the drink.
As Coca-Cola was regarded in the Soviet Union as a symbol of American imperialism, Zhukov was apparently reluctant to be photographed with or reported as consuming such a product.
According to journalist Tom Standage, without corroborating sources, Zhukov later asked whether Coca-Cola could be manufactured and packaged to resemble vodka.

Marshal Zhukov reportedly made this inquiry through General Mark W. Clark, commander of the US sector of Allied-occupied Austria, who passed the request on to US President Harry S. Truman. The President's staff contacted James Farley, chairman of the Board of the Coca-Cola Export Corporation. At the time, Farley was overseeing the establishment of 38 Coca-Cola plants in Southeast Europe, including Austria. Farley delegated Zhukov's special order to Mladin Zarubica, a technical supervisor for the Coca-Cola Company, He had been sent to Austria in 1946 to supervise establishment of a large bottling plant. Zarubica found a chemist who could remove the coloring from Coca-Cola.

The colorless version of Coca-Cola was bottled using straight, clear glass bottles with a white cap and a red star in the middle. The bottle and the cap were produced by the Crown Cork and Seal Company in Brussels. The first shipment of White Coke consisted of 50 cases.

One unusual consequence for the Coca-Cola Company was a relaxation of the regulations imposed by the occupying powers in Austria at the time. Coca-Cola supplies and products were required to transit a Soviet occupation zone while being transported between the Lambach bottling plant and the Vienna warehouse. While all goods entering the Soviet zone normally took weeks to be cleared by authorities, Coca-Cola shipments were never stopped.

See also 
 Coca-Cola Clear
 Crystal Pepsi

References 

Coca-Cola
Food and drink in the Soviet Union
Soviet Union–United States relations